Deborah K. W. Modrak is a classicist who focuses on Aristotle and who is professor of philosophy at the University of Rochester.

Biography
Modrak earned her doctorate at the University of Chicago in 1974.

Bibliography

References

Living people
20th-century American philosophers
Commentators on Aristotle
Year of birth missing (living people)
University of Chicago alumni
University of Rochester faculty